National Geographic Global Networks (formerly National Geographic Channels Worldwide and National Geographic Channels International) is a business unit within National Geographic Partners (a joint venture between The Walt Disney Company and the National Geographic Society) and Disney Entertainment (who handles distribution and advertising sales for National Geographic Global Networks) that oversees the National Geographic-branded television channels: National Geographic, Nat Geo Kids, Nat Geo Music, Nat Geo People and Nat Geo Wild and National Geographic Studios (formerly known as National Geographic Television). The unit itself was a joint operation between 21st Century Fox (21CF) and the Society, but it was later integrated into the new joint venture National Geographic Partners which they formed in 2015. On March 20, 2019, 21CF's share in National Geographic Partners was assumed by Disney, following its acquisition of most 21CF businesses.

History
National Geographic had moved towards launching a US cable channel in 1982, but backed out. National Geographic Television, National Geographic Society's for profit TV arm, and NBC formed a joint venture, National Geographic Channels (NGC). NGC then partnered with BSkyB to launch on September 1, 1997 National Geographic Channel services in U.K. and Ireland via BSkyB, Scandinavia via Telenor and Australia via Foxtel. Foxtel and BSkyB were then owned in some form by Rupert Murdoch. Sandy McGovern was president of NGC at the time. The 50/50 partnership was formed to expand NatGeo's National Geographic Television's productions, head by Tim Kelly, that was producing National Geographic Explorer for CBS. The original American version of the channel was launched on January 7, 2001 with Laureen Ong as president and Andrew Wilk as head of programming. National Geographic Society took down its museum and build a TV studio. At the time, the NatGeo kept its TV production unit and got a "sweet heart" guarantee production contract of 44 hours per year at an estimated $500,000 per hour of TV. Additional National Geographic channels in other parts of the world were also launched under the original joint venture.

In 2007, Ong was replaced by David Lyle, from the just closed Fox Reality channel, as CEO and president Howard Owens. In 2010, the company launched Nat Geo Wild channel in the US to go up against competitor Discovery channel. Ratings dropped as a whole and Lyle and Owens left in 2014. Courteney Monroe moved up from her head marketing post to take over NGC US.

National Geographic Partners unit
On September 9, 2015, the Society announced that it would reorganize its media properties and publications into a new company known as National Geographic Partners, which would be 73% owned by 21st Century Fox. This new, for-profit, corporation would own National Geographic and other magazines, as well as its affiliated television channels—most of which were already owned in joint ventures with Fox. In October 2016, it was announced that the National Geographic Channel, the flagship documentary channel, would drop the word "Channel" from its name.

Brands

Current
 National Geographic: The flagship television channel of the group which broadcasts documentaries on various subjects, as well as docu-reality shows.
 Nat Geo Wild: It is a sister channel to the flagship National Geographic television channel that focuses on animal-related wildlife and natural history programming.

Former
 National Geographic Adventure: Launched as Adventure One (abbr. A1), it was aimed at younger audiences, providing programming based around outdoor adventure, travel and stories involving people exploring the world.
 Nat Geo Music: A channel that focuses on ethnic music.
 Nat Geo Kids: A children's interest channel.
 Nat Geo Kids Abu Dhabi: A children's interest channel.
 Nat Geo People: Targeted at female audiences, the channel's programming focuses on people and cultures. Currently available in Poland and Romania.

Channels by region

All of National Geographic-branded television channels are operated as a part of this unit's business. The Society provides most of programming on the channels, while Disney's broadcast-related units (Walt Disney Television in the United States and Fox Networks Group outside the United States) handle distribution and advertisement sales of the channels. In most cases internationally, the National Geographic and Fox channels cross-promote each other. In some territories, the versions of National Geographic channels are directly operated by Disney.

Americas

Anglo-America
United States
 National Geographic
 National Geographic Wild
 Nat Geo Mundo (Spanish language programming)
Canada The following channels in Canada are operated by Corus Entertainment under license.
 National Geographic
 National Geographic Wild

Latin America
Spanish-speaking countries
 National Geographic (with sub-regional versions for Mexico, Colombia, Central America [which also covers Caribbean islands], Pacific [Chile, Peru, Ecuador and Bolivia], and Atlantic [Argentina, Paraguay and Uruguay])
Brazil
 National Geographic

Asia
NGC Network Asia, LLC operates all of National Geographic-branded television channels across Asia except Japan.

NGC Network Asia previously represented television channels from Fox International Channels (FIC) in the region, but they were transferred to the newly formed Asian branch of FIC in the 2009 reorganization of Star TV.

The Asian operations also oversee National Geographic TV channels in the Middle East and North Africa (except Israel).

Pan-regional channels (except Japan)
 National Geographic (Asia)
 Nat Geo Wild
Hong Kong, Southeast Asia and South Korea
 National Geographic
 Nat Geo Wild
Indian subcontinent Star India handles channel distribution and advertisement sales in the region.
 National Geographic
 Nat Geo Wild
 Nat Geo Tamil
 Nat Geo Telugu
Middle East and North Africa
 National Geographic (in English)
 National Geographic Abu Dhabi (in Arabic)
Taiwan
 National Geographic (in Chinese)
 National Geographic HD (in English)
Japan The following channels in Japan are operated by Fox Networks Group Japan.
 National Geographic

Europe
The European operations also oversee National Geographic TV channels in Israel, Australia and New Zealand. It is also responsible for the channels in Sub-Saharan Africa.
Balkans
National Geographic
National Geographic Wild 
Czech Republic and Slovakia
National Geographic
 National Geographic Wild
France
 National Geographic
 National Geographic Wild
Ukraine
 National Geographic
 National Geographic Wild
Greece
 National Geographic
Netherlands and Belgium
National Geographic
National Geographic Wild
Poland
National Geographic
 National Geographic Wild
Nat Geo People
Portugal
National Geographic
National Geographic Wild
Romania
National Geographic
Nat Geo People
Nordic and Scandinavia
 National Geographic
 National Geographic Wild
United Kingdom and Ireland
 National Geographic
 National Geographic Wild
Spain
 National Geographic
 National Geographic Wild
Sub-Saharan Africa
 National Geographic
 National Geographic Wild 
 Nat Geo Gold
Israel
 National Geographic
 National Geographic Wild
Germany
 National Geographic 
 National Geographic Wild

Former
Italy
 National Geographic
 National Geographic Wild
Russia and Belarus 
 National Geographic
 National Geographic Wild
Australia and New Zealand 
 National Geographic 
 National Geographic Wild
Turkey
 National Geographic
 National Geographic Wild

References

External links
 natgeotv.com: A gateway to the websites of National Geographic television channels worldwide
 National Geographic Partners, the parent company

National Geographic Society
Global Networks
Disney television networks
Fox Networks Group